Murugesh Rudrappa Nirani (born 18 August 1965), is an Indian  entrepreneur and politician serving as the Minister of Large and Medium Industries of Karnataka from 4 August 2021. He is a third-term Member of the Legislative Assembly (MLA) of Bilgi, Bagalkot and is a minister in the Government of Karnataka. He was honored with Doctorate (D. Litt.) Award for his social work from KIMSD University of Maharashtra on 5 December 2021.

Early life and education
Nirani was born in an agrarian family, to Rudrappa and Sushilamma, at Basav Hanchal in Bilagi taluk of Bagalkot district.

He completed his B.E. in civil engineering and gained a diploma in Business Management from Bombay University. He became one of the foremost engineers from his village.

Entrepreneurial career
Nirani set up his first sugar factory in Bagalkot, with a capacity of crushing 500 tonnes of sugarcane per day.

He has received the Make in India award on 24 December 2014. He is also the chairman of Nirani Group, which includes Nirani Sugars Ltd., Sai Priya Sugars Ltd., MRN Cane Power India Ltd., Nirani Cements Pvt. Ltd., and Bilagi Sugar Mill Ltd.

As of 2021, over 120,000 farmers benefit on the infrastructure created by MRN group and over 72,000 people are employed by the MRN Group. MRN group is also one of the largest producers of ethanol in India.

Political career
He joined the Rashtriya Swayamsevak Sangh during his adolescence and has been a very crucial part of his political ideology. He says that he derives inspiration from the ideologies of the Maharaja of Mysore, Krishna Raja Wadiyar IV.

Nirani worked as a grassroot worker of the BJP in North Karnataka. He contested his first election to Karnataka Legislative Assembly from Biligi in 2004 and won with a landslide victory.

On 30 May 2008, Nirani was elevated as the cabinet Minister of Large and Medium Scale Industries. He was again sworn in as the Minister of Mines and Geology in the Fourth Yediyurappa ministry.

References

External links 

Living people
University of Mumbai alumni
1965 births
21st-century Indian businesspeople
State cabinet ministers of Karnataka
People from Bagalkot district
Bharatiya Janata Party politicians from Karnataka
Karnataka MLAs 2008–2013
Karnataka MLAs 2004–2007
Karnataka MLAs 2018–2023